Michael Tunn (born 18 January 1974) is an Australian radio announcer and television presenter. He was hired by Australia's national youth station Triple J in 1990 at the age of 17, making him Australia's youngest professional radio presenter at the time.

Biography

Tunn was born and raised in Adelaide. He got his start in radio presenting 'Rock and Roll High School', a requests program for high school students, on Triple M (Triple M has since renamed to Three D Radio). Triple J hired him on 25 August 1990 as part of a major change to its lineup of presenters. The decision to hire Tunn attracted a high amount of media attention. He was, however, unable to go on air at the station until he completed high school. After completing school, Tunn moved to Sydney, where the station's studios were located and presented midnight to dawn shows over the Australian summer until be was given his own requests program, called 'J-Klub', in February 1991. In May that year he also began hosting The Afternoon Show on the ABC television station. By 1995, when Tunn was aged 21, he had presented shows on almost all of Triple J's shifts.

He is best known for hosting Triple J's evening request program The Request Fest. Michael hosted between 1992 and 1997, and was also the presenter of the Australian Broadcasting Corporation's children's TV program The Afternoon Show and a set of TV documentaries on youth body image during the early to mid 1990s.

Tunn quit Triple J in late 1999. At this time he was the station's assistant music director, but was frustrated by a lack of promotion opportunities. In June 2000 he joined 'bigfatradio.com', an online radio station that used proprietary web page streaming technology so that the end user was able to view pages sent from the studio. The station featured many ex Triple J staff including Angela Catterns, Andy Glitre, Helen Razer, Ian Rogerson and Debbie Spillane.

After the collapse of the venture in the Dot-Com bubble burst, he joined the Austereo network in January 2001 and became the Assistant Program Director and Afternoon Presenter of Triple M Adelaide and SAFM. He left the position on 27 March 2006. He was in talks to return to the ABC at the time, and in June took up a position as music director at 105.7 ABC Darwin.

References

1974 births
Living people
Triple J announcers
Triple M presenters
People from Adelaide
Australian television presenters